Baron O'Neill, of Shane's Castle in the County of Antrim, is a title in the Peerage of the United Kingdom. It was created in 1868 for the musical composer The Reverend William O'Neill. Born William Chichester, he succeeded to the estates of his cousin John Bruce Richard O'Neill, 3rd Viscount O'Neill, in 1855 (on whose death the viscountcy and barony of O'Neill became extinct) and assumed by Royal licence the surname of O'Neill in lieu of Chichester in order to inherit the lands of his cousin, despite not being descended in the male line from an O'Neill. The Chichesters trace their lineage to the name O'Neill through Mary Chichester, daughter of Henry O'Neill of Shane's Castle. Lord O'Neill was the patrilineal great-great-great-grandson of John Chichester, younger brother of Arthur Chichester, 2nd Earl of Donegall. The latter two were both nephews of Arthur Chichester, 1st Earl of Donegall, and grandsons of Edward Chichester, 1st Viscount Chichester (see the Marquess of Donegall for more information). Lord O'Neill was succeeded by his eldest son, the second Baron. He sat as a Conservative Member of Parliament for Antrim.

His eldest son and heir apparent, the Hon. Arthur O'Neill, represented Antrim Mid in the House of Commons as a Conservative from 1910 until 1914, when he was killed in action during the First World War, the first MP to die in the conflict. The second Baron was therefore succeeded by his grandson, Shane O'Neill, 3rd Baron O'Neill (the son of the Hon. Arthur O'Neill). He was killed in action in Italy during the Second World War. The title is currently held by his son, the fourth Baron, who succeeded in 1944. He was Lord Lieutenant of Antrim from 1994 to 2008.

Two other members of the O'Neill family have been elevated to the peerage. Hugh O'Neill, 1st Baron Rathcavan, was the youngest son of the second Baron O'Neill, while Terence O'Neill, Baron O'Neill of the Maine, Prime Minister of Northern Ireland, was the youngest brother of the third Baron.

The family seat is Shane's Castle, near Randalstown, County Antrim.

Barons O'Neill (1868)
William O'Neill, 1st Baron O'Neill (1813–1883)
Edward O'Neill, 2nd Baron O'Neill (1839–1928)
Shane Edward Robert O'Neill, 3rd Baron O'Neill (1907–1944)
Raymond Arthur O'Neill, 4th Baron O'Neill (b. 1933)

The heir apparent is the present holder's son the Hon. Shane Sebastian Clanaboy O'Neill (b. 1965).

See also
Marquess of Donegall
Earl O'Neill
Baron Rathcavan
Baron O'Neill of the Maine
Robert Torrens O'Neill
O'Neill dynasty

References

Baronies in the Peerage of the United Kingdom
Noble titles created in 1868
Extinct baronies in the Peerage of Ireland
Chichester family